opened in Yakumo, Hokkaidō, Japan in 1978. Its origins lie in a room for the display of historical materials established in 1952 in the old public hall, superseded in 1965 by storage facilities and an exhibition space in the new public hall. The display is organized around three main themes: history and the land, the Hokkaido Development Commission and the lives of the people, and local industries, including mining and the craft of kibori-guma, a museum of which lies next door. The collection of over thirteen thousand objects includes a Jōmon red ceramic vessel with spout from the Nodaoi I Site and an assemblage of artefacts from the Jōmon Kotan Onsen Site that has been designated an Important Cultural Property.

See also
 List of Cultural Properties of Japan - archaeological materials (Hokkaidō)
 List of Historic Sites of Japan (Hokkaidō)
 Hokkaido Museum

References

External links
 Yakumo Town Museum

Yakumo, Hokkaido
Museums in Hokkaido
Museums established in 1978
1978 establishments in Japan